Downfall – The Early Years is a compilation album of by the Dutch rock band The Gathering. The record was first released on 22 May 2001 by Hammerheart Records label. On 15 September 2008, an expanded version of the album was released by Vic Records.

Track listing

Credits 
Bart Smits – all vocals
Jelmer Wiersma – guitar
René Rutten – guitar
Hans Rutten – drums
Frank Boeijen – keyboards
Hugo Prinsen Geerligs – bass

Songwriting 
All music by The Gathering.
All lyrics by Bart Smits.

Production 
[3] Unreleased 7-inch EP 1991. Recorded at Beaufort Studios, the Netherlands. Produced by the Gathering and Han Swagerman Sr.
[2] Moonlight Archer demo, recorded live at the Caveman Studio, the Netherlands on 1 April 1991. Assisted by Johan. Produced by the Gathering
[1] An Imaginary Symphony demo. Recorded at the rehearsal room, Oss, the Netherlands, 18 October 1990. Assisted by Johan and Ralph. Produced by the Gathering

2008 reissue

Production 
 [demo] The 1992 Promo demo. Recorded at Popkollektief Oss, the Netherlands, Autumn 1992. Produced by the Gathering
 [3] Unreleased 7-inch EP 1991. Recorded at Beaufort Studios, the Netherlands. Produced by the Gathering and Han Swagerman Sr.
 [1] An Imaginary Symphony demo. Recorded at the rehearsal room, Oss, the Netherlands, 18 October 1990. Assisted by Johan and Ralph. Produced by the Gathering
 Dethroned Emperor written by Celtic Frost. Previously unreleased. Live recorded on 18 October 1990. Assisted by Johan and Ralph. Produced by the Gathering
 [2] Moonlight Archer demo, recorded live at the Caveman Studio, the Netherlands on 1 April 1991. Assisted by Johan. Produced by the Gathering
 [live] the Gathering live 1991–1993:
 Live 19 October 1991 @ de Zon, Bodegraven, the Netherlands
 Live 22 February 1992 @ Burgerweeshuis, Deventer, the Netherlands
 Live 30 January 1993 @ Ekke, Utrecht, the Netherlands
 Live 8 April 1993 @ Pinguin Club, Tel Aviv, Israel

References 

2001 compilation albums
The Gathering (band) albums